Helmet stickers, also known as reward decals and pride stickers, are stickers that are affixed to a high school or college football player's helmet. They can denote either individual or team accomplishments.

History
ESPN says the practice of awarding helmet stickers is often wrongly credited to Ernie Biggs, also an athletic trainer at Ohio State under legendary coach Woody Hayes. They instead claim that the practice of awarding stickers began with Jim Young, former assistant coach at Miami in 1965, two years before they were used by the Buckeyes.

An even earlier attribution is given to Gene Stauber, freshman coach at Nebraska (1955–1957) by head coach Pete Elliott. Stauber routinely used stickers throughout his tenure as assistant coach at Illinois (1960–1970), as a 1962 photo of All-American linebacker Dick Butkus indicates. The stickers stem from fighter pilots marking their planes with stickers or painted roundels after kills and/or successful missions.

Michael Pellowski, in his book Rutgers Football: A Gridiron Tradition in Scarlet, credits Rutgers defensive backs coach Dewey King with being “one of the first” to award decals for helmets in 1961. The stickers were given for interceptions only, so they were more difficult to earn. Every time there was an interception, the crowd yelled “give him the star.” The stars can be seen in a photo of the 1961 team walking from the locker room to the field prior to the season finale against Columbia.

Current usage

Division I

FBS
 Clemson: paw print /3.0/4.0
 Eastern Michigan: feather
 FIU: gold panther paw
 Florida State: tomahawk(Only awarded after team wins)
 Louisiana Lafayette: fleur de lis 
 Michigan: wolverine with players' personal achievements and area codes                            
 North Carolina: Tar Heel(only on traditional blue helmets)
 Northern Illinois: Bone/ Huskie logo
 Ohio State: buckeye tree leaf 
 Pittsburgh: panther head 
 Stanford: axe blade
 UNLV: spade
 UTEP: pick ax

FCS
 Alabama A&M
 Butler: dog bone
 Florida A&M: snake heads
 Fordham University: ram head
 Illinois State: Reggie Redbird
 New Hampshire 
 North Carolina A&T
 Weber State
 Youngstown State: white star

Discontinued usage
 Appalachian State: Yosef
 Arizona: Wildcat Paw
 Arizona State: Pitchfork 
 Arkansas: Hog head
 Arkansas State: "I Will"
 Baylor: Bear head
 Bowling Green: "BG" logo
 BYU: Gold Cougar (Personal Goals) and Blue Cougar (Team Goals, Wins)/"HC"(used only on throwback helmets)
 California: Football (football with big C and "WIN" on it, Growling Bear head ('70s))
 Central Michigan: Yellow Block C
 Colorado: Buffalo
 Colorado State: Ram horn
 Duke: Grim Reaper
 East Carolina: Skull Pirate Logo
 Florida Atlantic
 Fresno State: White Bone, Yellow Bone, and Black Bone
 Georgia: White Bone/Black Bone (Academic) (Used during the Mark Richt Era (2001-2015), White Stars during the Vince Dooley Years
 Georgia State: Panther, a block "M" (standing for magnanimatas, or "greatness of spirit" in Latin), and a gold star for academics
 University of Hawaii: Warrior helmet and cross spears 
 Houston: White Paw
 Indiana
 Iowa State: Cyclone 
 Kentucky: White Wildcat Paw/Blue Wildcat Paw (only on white helmets)
 Louisville: Cardinal
 Louisiana Monroe: Maroon Star/Warhawk Talon
 Marshall: Green Horn
 Maryland: Red Turtle and Yellow Turtle
 Memphis: Tiger Paw
 Miami: Green hurricane/Orange hurricane
 Miami(Ohio): Star/Tomahawk 
 Middle Tennessee State: Pegasus
 Michigan State: White "S"/ Javelin
 Missouri: Tiger Paw
 Mississippi State: Bulldog
 North Carolina State: Wolf Fang
 New Mexico: Lobo
 New Mexico State: Aggie "A"
 Nevada: Axe
 Northwestern: Wildcat logo
 Purdue: Train
 Rice: Owl
 Rutgers: Silver Star/Sword
 San Jose State: 100/100, “Prove It”(only on white helmets)
 SMU: Pony logo
 Southern Miss: Eagle
 South Carolina: Gamecock foot with spur
 South Florida: Green Bull Logo
 Temple: Diamond
 Tennessee
 Texas Tech: Red Star 
 Toledo: White Rocket/Yellow Rocket
 Tulane: Fleur-de-lis
 Tulsa: Skull and Crossbones
 UConn: Huskie/"C" logo
 UCLA: Blue Bear Paw
 Utah: Utes logo
 Utah State: Block letter 'A'/Bull
 Vanderbilt: Ship Anchor (only on gold helmets)
 Virginia 
 Virginia Tech
 Western Kentucky: "WKU" Red Towel logo
 Western Michigan: Crossed Oars (used only during the 2013–16 tenure of P. J. Fleck as head coach)
 West Virginia: Musket
 Wyoming: Small Bucking Horse

References

American football equipment
College football in the United States
High school football in the United States
Stickers